Jean Barman is a historian of British Columbia. Born in Stephen, Minnesota, United States, Barman arrived in British Columbia in 1971. Her work The West Beyond the West: A History of British Columbia has been described as the "standard text on the subject [of British Columbia history]." She has received the Lieutenant Governor's Medal for historical writing, and the 2006 City of Vancouver Book Award (for Stanley Park's Secret). She is a professor emerita at the University of British Columbia, as is her husband, the historian of Brazil Roderick Barman.

Education
University of British Columbia, 1982, EdD, History of education
University of California at Berkeley, 1970, MLS, Librarianship
Harvard University, 1963, MA, Russian studies
Macalester College, 1961, BA, International relations and history

Publications
Select works:
 Growing up British in British Columbia : boys in private school, 1982
 Indian education in Canada, 1986
 The West beyond the West : a history of British Columbia, 1991
 Sojourning sisters : the lives and letters of Jessie and Annie McQueen, 2000
 Constance Lindsay Skinner : writing on the frontier, 2000
 Leaving paradise : indigenous Hawaiians in the Pacific Northwest, 1787-1898, 2006
 Abenaki daring : the life and writings of Noel Annance, 1792-1869, 2016

References

External links
Thecommentary.ca
Vancouver.ca
Ojs.library.ubc.ca
Gov.bc.ca

Living people
20th-century Canadian historians
Academic staff of the University of British Columbia
University of British Columbia Faculty of Education alumni
University of California, Berkeley School of Information alumni
Harvard Graduate School of Arts and Sciences alumni
Macalester College alumni
People from Marshall County, Minnesota
Year of birth missing (living people)
Historians of British Columbia
21st-century Canadian historians